Under the Greenwood Tree  is a 1929 British historical drama film directed by Harry Lachman and starring Marguerite Allan, Nigel Barrie and Wilfred Shine. It is an adaptation of the 1872 novel Under the Greenwood Tree by Thomas Hardy.

Production and release
The film's sets were designed by Wilfred Arnold. It was made at Elstree Studios by the leading British company of the era British International Pictures. It was originally intended to be a silent film, but following the arrival of sound, songs and dialogue were added using the RCA system. It was released in September 1929, around the same time as The American Prisoner, both films following on from the company's first sound release, Alfred Hitchcock's Blackmail, in June.

A review in Close Up suggested it "has perhaps the best direction yet produced from a British studio".

Cast
 Marguerite Allan as Fancy Day
 Nigel Barrie as Shinar
 John Batten as Dick Dewey
 Maud Gill as Old Maid
 Wilfred Shine as Parson Maybold
 Roberta Abel as Penny
 Antonia Brough as Maid
 Tom Coventry as Tranter Dewey
 Robison Page as Grandfather Dewey
 Tubby Phillips as Tubby
 Bill Shine as Leaf
 Peggie Robb-Smith as Allan
 Queenie Leighton as Uncredited

References

Bibliography
 Low, Rachael. History of the British Film, 1918–1929. George Allen & Unwin, 1971.
 Wood, Linda. British Films, 1927-1939. British Film Institute, 1986.

External links

1929 films
Films shot at British International Pictures Studios
Films based on works by Thomas Hardy
Films directed by Harry Lachman
British historical drama films
1920s historical drama films
Films set in England
Transitional sound drama films
British black-and-white films
1929 drama films
1920s English-language films
1920s British films